Cauchas brunnella is a moth of the Adelidae family. It is found in Uzbekistan.

References

Moths described in 1980
Adelidae
Insects of Central Asia